Life is the second studio album of The Cardigans. It was released worldwide in 1995 and was an international success, especially in Japan, where it achieved platinum status. Outside of Sweden and Japan (where debut Emmerdale had been released in 1994), it was released as their first album: a compilation of tracks from both Emmerdale and Life. It was released in the United States under the label Minty Fresh Records.

Track listing
All music composed by Peter Svensson, except "Sabbath Bloody Sabbath" by Iommi, Butler, Ward, Osbourne

Swedish edition
 "Carnival" (Lyrics: Nina Persson, Svensson, Sveningsson) – 3:37
 "Gordon's Gardenparty" (Lyrics: Persson, Svensson) – 3:22
 "Daddy's Car" (Lyrics: Sveningsson, Bengt Lagerberg) – 3:35
 "Pikebubbles" (Lyrics: Sveningsson, Svensson) – 3:05
 "Tomorrow" (Lyrics: Sveningsson) – 3:05
 "Beautiful One" (Lyrics: Sveningsson) – 3:28
 "Travelling with Charley" (Lyrics: Sveningsson, Svensson) – 4:09
 "Fine" (Lyrics: Sveningsson) – 3:11
 "Sunday Circus Song" (Lyrics: Sveningsson, Svensson) – 3:56
 "Hey! Get Out of My Way" (Lyrics: Persson, Svensson) – 3:30
 "Closing Time" (Lyrics: Lars-Olof Johansson, Sveningsson, Svensson) – 10:22

UK, French, Canadian and Brazilian version
 "Carnival" – 3:37
 "Gordon's Gardenparty" – 3:22
 "Daddy's Car" – 3:35
 "Sick & Tired" (Lyrics: Sveningsson) – 3:24
 "Tomorrow" – 3:05
 "Rise & Shine" (Lyrics: Sveningsson) – 3:30
 "Beautiful One" – 3:28
 "Travelling with Charley" – 4:09
 "Fine" – 3:11
 "Celia Inside" (Lyrics: Sveningsson) – 4:42
 "Hey! Get Out of My Way" – 3:32
 "After All..." (Lyrics: Sveningsson) – 2:57
 "Sabbath Bloody Sabbath" (Lyrics: Butler) – 4:32

This version omits "Pikebubbles", "Sunday Circus Song" and "Closing Time", replacing them with "Sick & Tired", "Rise & Shine", "Celia Inside", "After All..." and "Sabbath Bloody Sabbath" from Emmerdale. "Celia Inside" is a longer edit, and "Rise & Shine" is a new recording, while the others are taken directly from the previous album. The omitted song "Pikebubbles" was released internationally as the B side to the 1995 "Rise & Shine" single. Additionally, "Hey! Get Out Of My Way" is single version.

US edition
 "Carnival" – 3:36
 "Daddy's Car" – 3:35
 "Fine" – 3:09
 "Rise & Shine" – 3:28
 "Our Space" – 3:29
 "Celia Inside" – 4:40
 "Over the Water" – 2:13
 "Tomorrow" – 3:03
 "Sick & Tired" – 3:23
 "Beautiful One" – 3:27
 "Gordon's Gardenparty" – 3:19
 "Hey! Get Out of My Way" – 3:30
 "Sabbath Bloody Sabbath" – 4:30
 "Happy Meal" – 2:36

This version omits "Pikebubbles", "Travelling with Charley", "Sunday Circus Song" and "Closing Time", replacing them with "Rise & Shine", "Our Space", "Celia Inside", "Over the Water", "Sick & Tired" and "Sabbath Bloody Sabbath" from Emmerdale and exclusive US bonus track "Happy Meal". The four omitted tracks were included as a bonus disc with the US version of Emmerdale, released in 1997.

Personnel
Lars-Olof Johansson - keyboards, piano
Bengt Lagerberg - drums, percussion 
Nina Persson - lead vocals
Magnus Sveningsson -  bass, vocals 
Peter Svensson - guitar, vocals

Other appearances
"Carnival" was featured in the soundtracks of the 1997 film Austin Powers: International Man of Mystery and the 1996 Australian film Love And Other Catastrophes.
"Carnival" was featured in one episode of MTV animated series Daria.

Singles

Continental Europe/UK
"Sick & Tired" (March 1995, #96 UK)
"Carnival" (10 June 1995, #72 UK)
"Sick & Tired" (re-release, 23 September 1995, #34 UK)
"Carnival" (re-release, 25 November 1995, #35 UK)
"Rise & Shine" (10 February 1996, #29 UK)

Japan/Sweden
"Carnival"
"Hey! Get Out of My Way"
"Rise & Shine" (Japan only re-release)

Charts

Certifications

External links
The Cardigans discography at the band's official site
Polyhex UK chart information

References

1995 albums
The Cardigans albums
Albums produced by Tore Johansson
Stockholm Records albums
Minty Fresh Records albums